Setaro's dwarf chameleon (Bradypodion setaroi) is a species of lizard in the family Chamaeleonidae.

Etymology
The specific name, setaroi, is in honor of Gordon Setaro who collected the holotype with Raw.

Description
It has a reduced throat crest and a tail that is longer than the body in males, and shorter than the body in females.

Geographic range and habitat
B. setaroi is endemic to South Africa, where it is restricted to coastal dune forests in northern Kwazulu Natal. It adapts well to suburban gardens, but domestic cats - as introduced predators - will usually kill all chameleons in the immediate area.

References

Further reading
Raw LRG (1976). "A survey of the dwarf chameleons of Natal, South Africa, with description of three new species". Durban Museum Novitates 11 (7): 139–161. (Bradypodion setaroi, new species).

External links
Search for Distribution of Bradypodion setaroi

Bradypodion
Reptiles of South Africa
Reptiles described in 1976
Taxonomy articles created by Polbot